The sandy gallito (Teledromas fuscus) is a species of suboscine passerine bird in the family Rhinocryptidae, the tapaculos. It is the only species placed in the genus Teledromas. It is endemic to Argentina.

Taxonomy
The sandy gallito is the only member of its genus and has no subspecies. It is genetically most closely related to the crested gallito (Rhinocrypta lanceolata).

Description
Two male specimens weighed  respectively; one female weighted . In the adult, the crown of the head, back, and wings are light cinnamon as are the central feathers of the tail. The rest of the tail is blackish. The throat and chest are white, blending to light cinnamon on the flanks and vent area. The juvenile is thought to have similar plumage.

The typical song of the sandy gallito is a phrase off "loud 'tchowk' notes" repeated up to five times in Río Negro and up to 10 times in other parts of the range.

Distribution and habitat

The sandy gallito is a year round resident of the eastern slope of the Andes of Argentina from southwestern Salta Province in the north to Río Negro Province in the south. Its habitat is subtropical or tropical dry shrubland characterized by sparse vegetation on sand and gravel, dry washes, and ravines.

Behavior

Feeding

The sandy gallito's principal food is thought to be arthropods. It forages solely on the ground while trying to stay hidden by running between bushes.

Breeding

Eggs are laid between November and February.

Status

The IUCN has assessed the sandy gallito as of Least Concern. Though its population has not been determined, it is believed to be stable and the species is thought to be fairly common. It inhabits several protected areas and its habitat is not amenable to agricultural development.

References

sandy gallito
Endemic birds of Argentina
sandy gallito
sandy gallito
sandy gallito
Taxonomy articles created by Polbot